Richard Samuels may refer to:

 Richard J. Samuels (born 1951), American political scientist
 Richard L. Samuels (1926–2001), Cook County Circuit judge
Richard R. Samuels, state legislator in Arkansas